Peski is a village in Belarus. It is located in the Kamianiec district, Brest Province, 338 km south-west of the capital Minsk and near the Polish border.

External links 
 Location including the places

Villages in Belarus
Peski